Ohio elected its members October 12, 1858, netting a 3-seat Republican gain.

See also 
 1859 Ohio's 14th congressional district special election
 1858 and 1859 United States House of Representatives elections
 List of United States representatives from Ohio

Notes

References 

1858
Ohio
United States House of Representatives